List of Wales national rugby union players is a list of players who have represented Wales at rugby union. The list only includes players who have played in a Test match for the senior men's team. The players are listed in order of chronological appearance for the national team. Players that were first capped during the same match are listed in order of those that began in the starting line up before replacements and then in alphabetical order by surname.

Ten former Welsh internationals from the Wales national rugby union team have been inducted into the International Rugby Hall of Fame, while eight have been inducted into the World Rugby Hall of Fame. One Welsh player, Shane Williams in 2008, has been awarded World Rugby Player of the Year (formerly known as the International Rugby Board Player of the Year).

1880s – 1950s
Somerset-born Frank Hancock, a 2011 inductee into the World Rugby Hall of Fame, changed the game of rugby when he was played as a fourth three-quarter for Cardiff. When given the captaincy of Wales in 1886 he trialed the system against Scotland, the very first international match to see four three-quarters play. Although the system was abandoned during the match, it was readopted by Wales in 1888 and was quickly absorbed by the other Home Nation countries. It is now the standard formation in world rugby.

Known as the "Prince of three-quarters", Gwyn Nicholls played 24 Tests for Wales at centre between 1896 and 1906. He was the only Welsh player in the British Isles team of 1899, and was the star for Wales during their first golden era. Not only did he captain Wales to three Triple Crowns, but also led them to their famous victory over the All Blacks in 1905. On 26 December 1949, gates bearing his name at Cardiff Arms Park were officially opened.

Bleddyn Williams and Jack Matthews, both centres who were inducted into the World Rugby Hall of Fame in 2013, were called by World Rugby "a uniquely complementary and successful partnership at club, national team and Lions levels after the Second World War". Both captained Cardiff and Wales, made their international debuts in 1947, and were on the Lions squad that toured Australia and New Zealand in 1950. Williams, nicknamed the "Prince of Centres", earned 22 caps for Wales and five for the Lions in an eight-year Test career. Wales won all five Tests in which he served as captain; at the time of his induction, he was the only Wales captain with a 100% winning record. Williams went on to become a prominent rugby commentator. Matthews, renowned for his strong tackling, earned 17 caps for Wales and six for the Lions, calling time on his Test career in 1951. After his playing career, he became the Lions' first team doctor, serving in that role during the 1980 tour to South Africa.

Named the greatest Welsh player of the 1950s by the WRU, Cliff Morgan played 29 Tests for Wales, and four for the British Lions between 1951 and 1958. Morgan played at fly-half and was one of the sport's biggest crowd-pullers during his career. He played during Wales' Five Nations Grand Slam of 1952, and their victory over the All Blacks in 1953, but he is most famous for captaining the British Lions in South Africa in 1955. One of Morgan's great friends was Carwyn James. Although most notable for his coaching record, James appeared for Wales in two Tests in 1958. He coached the British Lions to their only series victory over New Zealand in 1971, with a team including many Welsh players. He also coached Welsh club Llanelli, and the Barbarians side that defeated the All Blacks in 1973. Despite this, he never coached Wales. Morgan, inducted into the International Rugby Hall of Fame in 1997, was further honoured with induction into the World Rugby Hall of Fame in 2009.

1960s – present
When Wales faced Australia on 3 December 1966, two future Rugby Hall of Fame members made their Test debuts; Gerald Davies and Barry John. Davies played 46 Tests for Wales between 1966 and 1978. Although he started out playing in the centre, he was moved to the wing during Wales' 1969 tour of New Zealand and Australia, and eventually scored 20 Test tries for Wales. Davies also played for the Lions during their 1968 tour of South Africa and 1971 tour of New Zealand. Barry John was also selected for the 1968 Lions' tour of South Africa. Playing at fly-half, he helped Wales to a Five Nations Grand Slam in 1971, and then the Lions to their one and only series win over the All Blacks that same year. His exploits on the Lions tour of 1971 were rewarded with the nickname of "The King" by the New Zealand press, though the pressure of expectation and fame saw him quit rugby the following year.

Widely regarded as the greatest rugby union player of all time, Gareth Edwards played 53 Tests for Wales at scrum-half between 1967 and 1978. Edwards was never dropped from the team and played all 53 of his Tests consecutively. He also played in three Lions tours; including the series victories in New Zealand in 1971, and the unbeaten tour of South Africa in 1974. Edwards won five Triple Crowns with Wales and three Five Nations Grand Slams. He also scored a try for the Barbarians against the All Blacks in 1973, remembered as "that try" and considered one of the sport's greatest. In 2003, Edwards was voted the greatest player of all time by Rugby World magazine. In 2007, Edwards earned an additional honour with his induction into the World Rugby Hall of Fame.

In 1969, three Hall of Fame members debuted for Wales; Phil Bennett, Mervyn Davies, and JPR Williams. Bennett played 29 Tests for Wales. He started out playing at fullback, but after Barry John retired, he was moved to fly-half. As well as representing Wales, he played eight Tests for the Lions and captained them on their 1977 tour of New Zealand. Mervyn Davies was known as "Merve the Swerve" and played 38 consecutive Tests for Wales between 1969 and 1976, losing only eight of them. After captaining Wales in his last nine appearances, Davies was forced to retire due to a brain haemorrhage. JPR Williams played 55 Tests for Wales between 1969 and 1981. Playing at fullback, he won three Five Nations Grand Slams with Wales in the 1970s, and captained Wales in 1979. He also toured with the British Lions in 1971 and 1974, and in 2008 a readers poll in The Telegraph voted him the greatest Lions' fullback of all time.

Ieuan Evans played for Wales between 1987 and 1998, and in the process earned 72 Welsh caps while the nation was transcending the amateur and professional eras. Playing mainly on the wing, Evans scored 33 tries for Wales, a record until surpassed by Gareth Thomas in 2004. As well as that, he was awarded seven Lions caps from the 1989, 1993 and 1997 tours.

In November 2008, Shane Williams and Ryan Jones became the first Welsh players to be nominated in a group of five players for the World Rugby Player of the Year award, first awarded in 2001. Shane Williams was duly selected as the 2008 World Rugby Player of the Year. Leigh Halfpenny was nominated in 2013 and Alun Wyn Jones in 2015.

List

See also
 List of Wales national rugby union team captains

References

 
Wales